Yttriaite-(Y) is an exceedingly rare mineral, a natural form of yttrium oxide, Y2O3. In terms of chemistry it is yttrium-analogue of kangite, arsenolite, avicennite and senarmontite (isometric minerals). Other minerals with the general formula A2O3 include corundum, bismite, bixbyite, eskolaite, hematite, karelianite, sphaerobismoite, tistarite, and valentinite. Yttriaite-(Y) forms tiny inclusions in native tungsten.

References

Oxide minerals
Yttrium minerals
Cubic minerals